Anton Germanovich Siluanov (born 12 April 1963) is a Russian politician and economist serving as Minister of Finance since 2011. He served as First Deputy Prime Minister of Russia from 2018 to 2020.

In 2011, he was appointed Minister of Finance by Prime Minister Vladimir Putin substituting in this position Alexei Kudrin, who was forced out and  dismissed by president Dmitry Medvedev after publicly criticizing the additional defense spending of 2.1 trillion rubles (US$66 billion) through 2014.

Biography
In 1985, Siluanov graduated from the Moscow Finance Institute with a degree in "Finance and credit". In 1994, he obtained a PhD degree in economics (Russian nomenclature for the degree is кандидат экономических наук).

From August 1985 to March 1987, Siluanov served as a senior economist for the Ministry of Finance of the Russian Soviet Federative Socialist Republic. From March 1987 to May 1989, he was drafted and served in the Soviet Army.

From May 1989 to January 1992, he was a senior economist, a department head and a chief consultant and adviser for the Ministry of Finance. In February 1992, he was appointed as Deputy Head of the Ministry of Economics and Finance of the Russian Federation. From February 1992 to October 1997, he was the Deputy Head of Budget Office and Deputy Head of Budget Department of the Russian Ministry of Finance.

From October 1997 to July 2003, Siluanov led macro-economic policy and banking activities at the Russian Ministry of Finance.

On March 22, 2001, he became a member of the Board of the Ministry of Finance. From July 2003 to May 2004, he was the Deputy Minister of Finance, and from May 2004 to December 12, 2005, he served as Director of the intergovernmental relations of the Ministry of Finance of Russia, Deputy Minister.

On September 27, 2011, the Prime Minister of Russia, Vladimir Putin, appointed him as Acting Minister of Finance of Russia, replacing in office the long-term minister, Alexei Kudrin. Prime Minister Vladimir Putin, who announced the appointment at a government meeting on September 27, 2011, after it was approved by Medvedev, said Siluanov was a “good, solid specialist.” First Deputy Prime Minister Igor Shuvalov will take over the responsibilities Kudrin had as the deputy prime minister in charge of the economy. Alexey Kudrin will be replaced by Anton Siluanov in International Monetary Fund, World Bank and in Eurasian Anticrisis economic Fund — ACF (Антикризисном фонде ЕврАзЭС) under Eurasian Development Bank.

Minister of Finance

On 26 March 2014, the IMF secured an $18bn bailout fund for the provisional government of the Ukraine in the aftermath of the 2014 Ukrainian revolution.  It remains unclear whether Siluanov approved the use of Russian money for this purpose, or whether he was able to prevent this by withholding consent.  Russia has a seat to itself amongst 24 on the Executive Board of the IMF, whereas its monetary contribution to the IMF is inferior to two countries who have no such seat.

U.S. sanctions target 

Awards
Diploma of the Ministry of Finance (2001)
Prize of the Minister of Finance (2002)
Order For Merit to the Fatherland IV degree (2011)

References

External links

Meet Russia's New Finance Minister
Profile: Anton Siluanov

1963 births
Living people
1st class Active State Councillors of the Russian Federation
Economists from Moscow
United Russia politicians
21st-century Russian politicians
Finance ministers of Russia
Financial University under the Government of the Russian Federation alumni
Deputy heads of government of the Russian Federation
Russian individuals subject to the U.S. Department of the Treasury sanctions
Politicians from Moscow